The Pillars of Society is a play by Henrik Ibsen. It may also refer to the following films based on the play:

 Pillars of Society (1920 film), silent film
 Pillars of Society (1935 film), German film